Tackey Chan(陳德基) is an American state legislator serving in the Massachusetts House of Representatives. He is a Quincy resident and a member of the Democratic Party.  He and Donald Wong were the first Asian-Americans elected to the Massachusetts General Court. Chan was born and raised in the Wollaston section of Quincy.  He attended the New England School of Law.

He first won election to the state legislature in the fall of 2010 and took office in the spring of 2011. He ran again in 2012, 2014, and 2016, winning each time unopposed.

See also
 2019–2020 Massachusetts legislature
 2021–2022 Massachusetts legislature

References							
							

Living people
Democratic Party members of the Massachusetts House of Representatives
Politicians from Quincy, Massachusetts
American politicians of Hong Kong descent
21st-century American politicians
1973 births
Asian-American people in Massachusetts politics